John Leader (14 May 1908 – 22 March 1995) was a New Zealand cricketer and mountaineer. He played eleven first-class matches for Otago between 1928 and 1941. He played schools representative cricket for Otago.

See also
 List of Otago representative cricketers

References

External links
 

1908 births
1995 deaths
New Zealand cricketers
Otago cricketers
Cricketers from Christchurch